Hermann Georg Willibald Koch (2 April 1882 Võru – 29 March 1957 Lüdersfeld, West Germany) was an Estonian politician. He was a member of I Riigikogu.

From 1918 to 1919 he was Minister of German-minority Affairs.

References

1882 births
1957 deaths
People from Võru
People from Kreis Werro
Estonian people of German descent
Baltic-German people
German-Baltic Party politicians
Government ministers of Estonia
Members of the Estonian Constituent Assembly
Members of the Riigikogu, 1920–1923
Members of the Riigikogu, 1932–1934
University of Tartu alumni
Estonian emigrants to Germany